"Moon Water" is a song recorded by Japanese singer Shizuka Kudo, from her tenth studio album, Purple. It was released through Pony Canyon as the album's second single on May 19, 1995. When Kudo appeared on the AX tanpatsu drama Ren'ai Zenya: Ichido Dake 2 (1996) as a drawing-class model, the artwork she was the subject of is revealed to be a direct replication of the "Moon Water" cover art.

Background
"Moon Water" was written by Kudo, under the pseudonym Aeri, and Arata Tanimoto. It is written in the key of B-flat major and set to a tempo of 104 beats per minute. Kudo's vocals span from F3 to B4. Tanimoto was a classmate of the comedian Takaaki Ishibashi, who Kudo would later go on to record the duet "A.S.A.P." with, which was released as a single in 1997. When Kudo first received Tanimoto's demo for the song, her first impression was that of flowing water. The single's B-side, "Still Water", is a song created around the same demo track but with different lyrics and arrangement.

Chart performance
The single entered the Oricon Singles Chart at number 15, selling 61,000 copies in its first week and becoming Kudo's first single to debut outside of the top ten. It peaked at number 14 on its second week, outselling its first week sales figure with 63,000 copies sold. "Moon Water" became Kudo's first single to not reach the top ten since her solo debut. The single charted a total of seven weeks in the top 100.

Track listing

Charts

Certification

References

1995 songs
1995 singles
Songs with lyrics by Shizuka Kudo
Shizuka Kudo songs
Pony Canyon singles